Rock 'n' Roll Music is a double album by the English rock band the Beatles containing previously released tracks. It was issued on 7 June 1976 in the United States, on Capitol Records (catalogue number SKBO 11537), and on Parlophone (PCSP 719) in the United Kingdom, four days later. The 28-track compilation includes 15 Lennon–McCartney songs, one George Harrison composition ("Taxman"), and a dozen cover versions of songs written by significant rock and roll composers of the 1950s, including Chuck Berry, Little Richard, Carl Perkins and Larry Williams. Not counting the 1971 Spanish compilation album, Por Siempre Beatles, Rock 'n' Roll Music was the first Beatles album to include "I'm Down", which had previously only been available as the B-side of the "Help!" single.

Controversial album cover
Controversy surrounded the album's artwork, which featured an embossed colour portrait of the Beatles against a shiny silver background, with the album's title spelled out in what is presumed to be neon lights. Symbols of the 1950s were used on the inside of the album's gatefold sleeve, including a jukebox, an outdoor movie screen with a picture of Marilyn Monroe, an ice cream, a 1957 Chevrolet, a cheeseburger, and a glass of Coca-Cola. 1950s nostalgia was at a peak around the time the album was released and Capitol was clearly attempting to cash in on the trend. As the Beatles were a 1960s band, the album cover prompted Ringo Starr to complain to Rolling Stone: "It made us look cheap and we never were cheap. All that Coca-Cola and cars with big fins was the Fifties!" Lennon was also critical of the artwork and wrote an angry letter to Capitol Records saying it "looks like a Monkees reject" and instead suggested the use of photos by Astrid Kirchherr or Jürgen Vollmer, both of whom had photographed the band during their Hamburg days. Lennon had also offered to design the cover himself, but was declined.

Views
This album is described as "troubled" by Beatles producer George Martin in his autobiography, as he was asked by Bhaskar Menon, the president of Capitol at the time, to approve the tapes they intended to use, and he was "appalled" because they were some of the early twin-track mono tapes they had made and were going to be transferred to stereo for the issue. Instead of approving the album as it was presented to him, Martin reworked the already mixed tapes for every song, reversing the left and right channels and slightly narrowing the stereo on the tracks "Twist and Shout", "I Saw Her Standing There", "I Wanna Be Your Man", "Boys", "Roll Over Beethoven", "Drive My Car" and "I'm Down". Some of the song editing is not clean: for instance, the beginning of the crossfade of "Dear Prudence" can be heard during the fade of "Back in the U.S.S.R.", as originally issued on the White Album.

EMI Records in Britain refused to use Martin's reworked Capitol tapes, citing The Beatles' strict instructions that any reissues had to be exactly as originally recorded.

The UK Parlophone double album PCSP 719 kept the original UK mixes including the five stereo mixes of songs that had not yet appeared in stereo in the UK: the Long Tall Sally EP and "I'm Down".

In October 1980, the album was divided into two single albums, and released as budget LPs in both the UK and the United States. Rock 'n' Roll Music: Volume 1 (UK LP: EMI/Music for Pleasure MFP 50506, 24 October 1980; US LP: Capitol SN-16020, 27 October 1980) contained the songs on sides one and two of the original album, while Rock 'n' Roll Music: Volume 2 (UK LP: EMI/Music for Pleasure MFP 50507, 24 October 1980; US LP: Capitol SN-16021, 27 October 1980) consisted of the songs on sides three and four. This time, the British release contained George Martin's Capitol versions.

The budget-line albums featured new artwork, based on a picture of the group circa 1964. The US editions of the cover set the group in a crowd, while the British cover eliminated the crowd and placed the group against a stark white background.

Chart performance and sales
Album sales benefited from a rather significant wave of Beatles nostalgia that was taking place during the summer of 1976. Interest in the band was undoubtedly boosted by Paul McCartney's "Wings over America" tour, which criss-crossed the United States and Canada shortly after Rock 'n' Roll Music was released.  In addition, sales were not hurt by the fact that the album included the song "Helter Skelter", of which a cover version had been spotlighted in a made-for-television movie on the 1969 Charles Manson murders that aired shortly before the album was released. Rock 'n' Roll Music hit number 2 on the Billboard 200 in the US (kept off the top spot by McCartney's Wings at the Speed of Sound), and number 11 on the UK's Top 60 Albums Chart.  It marked the second time a Beatles album competed with a Paul McCartney album over the top two positions on the Billboard chart.  During the week ending June 6, 1970, the Beatles' album Let It Be jumped to the number 2 position from its previous week's debut at number 104, while McCartney's self-titled debut album McCartney held at number 1 for a third straight week.  The next week, Let It Be bumped up to number 1, while McCartney slid to number 2, where both albums remained positioned for four consecutive weeks.

Singles
In both the United States and Britain, Rock 'n' Roll Music was accompanied by a single compiled from songs on the album. The US single (Capitol 4274), was originally planned as "Helter Skelter" on the A-side and "Got to Get You into My Life" on the reverse, but when the Helter Skelter TV movie was announced for April 1976, Capitol thought better of the connotations and flipped the sides. "Got to Get You Into My Life" hit number 7 on the Billboard Hot 100. The British single (Parlophone R 6016), which consisted of "Back in the U.S.S.R." backed by "Twist and Shout", hit number 19.

Track listing
All songs written by Lennon-McCartney unless otherwise noted.

Charts and certifications

Charts

Year-end charts

Certifications and sales

Notes

Sources

External links
Notes on releases

The Beatles compilation albums
1976 compilation albums
Albums produced by George Martin
Albums produced by Phil Spector
Capitol Records compilation albums
Parlophone compilation albums
Albums arranged by George Martin
Albums recorded at Apple Studios